

This is a list of the National Register of Historic Places listings in Yavapai County, Arizona.  It is intended to be a complete list of the properties and districts on the National Register of Historic Places in Yavapai County, Arizona, United States.  The locations of National Register properties and districts for which the latitude and longitude coordinates are included below, may be seen in a map.

There are 132 properties and districts listed on the National Register in the county, including 1 that is also a National Historic Landmark. 65 of these properties and districts are located in the city of Prescott, and are listed separately, while the remaining properties and districts (including the National Historic Landmark) are located elsewhere in the county, and are listed here.  Three properties listed outside Prescott have been removed from the register.

Current listings

Prescott

Exclusive of Prescott

|}

Former listings

|}

See also

 List of National Historic Landmarks in Arizona
 National Register of Historic Places listings in Arizona

References

 01
 
History of Yavapai County, Arizona
Yavapai
Yavapai County, Arizona